Bel-Ombre is a village in Mauritius located in Savanne District. The village is administered by the Bel-Ombre Village Council under the aegis of the Savanne District Council. According to the census made by Statistics Mauritius in 2011, the population was 2,417.

See also 
 Districts of Mauritius
 List of places in Mauritius

References 

Populated places in Mauritius
Savanne District